Kungur Ice Cave is a karst cave located in the Urals, near the town Kungur in Perm Krai, Russia, on the right bank of the Sylva River. The cave is noted for its ice formations and is a popular tourist landmark.

History and archaeology 

Kungur Ice Cave has been known since 1703 when Peter the Great issued the decree sending a well-known geographer Semyon Remezov from Tobolsk in Kungur. He worked out the Uyezd plan and made the first sketch of the cave.

The cave has been an excursion site since 1914, and it is equipped with three tour routes of different length: 
 The third is the biggest,  and around 1.5 hour. On this tour, there is a laser show and the route is more difficult.

One hundred thousand visitors come each year, and over five million people have been to the cave since it opened.

In the eastern part of "The Ice Mountain" there are two sites of ancient settlements from the 7th-9th centuries, relating to Lomovatov culture. Yermakov's site of ancient settlement has been known since the 19th century.

Myth and stories 

Inside the cave there is a set of narrow stone steps called "the female tears". The name comes from a story, that a long time ago a foreign princess tripped and fell on them. After she returned home she got married. Since then, it is said that if a woman falls down on these steps she will get married soon.

Gallery

References

External links 

 Official site of Kungur ice cave

Caves of Russia
Ice caves
Show caves
Landforms of Perm Krai
Tourist attractions in Perm Krai
Natural monuments of Russia